The Bodleian Libraries are a collection of 28 libraries that serve the University of Oxford in England, including the Bodleian Library itself, as well as many other (but not all) central and faculty libraries. As of the 2016–17 year, the libraries collectively hold almost 13 million printed items, as well as numerous other objects and artefacts.

A major product of this collaboration has been a joint integrated library system, OLIS (Oxford Libraries Information System), and its public interface, SOLO (Search Oxford Libraries Online), which provides a union catalogue covering all member libraries, as well as the libraries of individual colleges and other faculty libraries, which are not members of the group but do share cataloguing information.

One of its busiest libraries is the Social Science Library, which, at its peak, serves 7,500 visitors in a period of approximately nine weeks.

History 
Founded in February 2000 as Oxford University Library Services (OULS), the organisation was renamed on 2 March 2010.

As of the 2018-2019 year, the group cares for almost 13 million printed items,  of archives and manuscripts, and a staff of over 561 (full-time equivalents). It is the second largest library in the UK (behind the British Library). The continued growth of the library has resulted in a severe shortage of storage space. Over 1.5 million items are stored outside Oxford. Locations formerly used included a redundant village church at Nuneham Courtenay and a disused salt mine in Cheshire. In 2007 and 2008, in an effort to obtain better and more capacious storage facilities for the library’s collections, Oxford University Library Services (OULS) tried to obtain planning permission to build a new book depository on the Osney Mead site, to the southwest of Oxford city centre. However, this application was unsuccessful and the new Book Storage Facility was instead constructed at a site on South Marston Industrial Estate on the outskirts of Swindon. This Book Storage Facility, which cost £26 million, opened in October 2010 and has 153 miles (246 kilometres) of shelving, including 3,224 bays with 95,000 shelf levels, and 600 map cabinets to hold 1.2 million maps and other items. Previously-existing Osney Mead premises are used for backroom operations, including the Packing and Design Service department.

Structure
The Bodleian Libraries group includes centralised departments:

 Academic and Learning Services (ALS)
 Scholarly Resources, which includes Bodleian Digital Library Systems and Services (BDLSS), Collections Management (Collections & Resource Description and Storage & Logistics)
 Communications
 Conservation and Collection Care

The current Director of the Libraries Richard Ovenden, like his predecessors Sarah Thomas and founding director Reginald Carr, holds the position concurrently with that of Bodley's Librarian since 2014. Senior administrative staff are based in the Clarendon Building on the central Bodleian estate.

Libraries
As of September 2017, the website of the group lists the following member libraries:

 Bodleian KB Chen China Centre Library
 Bodleian Education Library
 Bodleian Health Care Libraries (Cairns Library at John Radcliffe Hospital, Knowledge Centre at Old Road, Nuffield Orthopaedic Centre, Horton Library at Horton General Hospital, Banbury)
 Bodleian History Faculty Library, in Radcliffe Camera
 Bodleian Japanese Library
 Bodleian Latin American Centre Library
 Bodleian Law Library
 Bodleian Library (Old Library, Radcliffe Camera, Weston Library)
 Bodleian Music Faculty Library
 Bodleian Oriental Institute Library
 Bodleian Social Science Library
 English Faculty Library
 Leopold Muller Memorial Library (Jewish studies)
 Philosophy and Theology Faculties Library, in former Radcliffe Infirmary building
 Radcliffe Science Library (including the Alexander Library of Ornithology)
 Rewley House Continuing Education Library
 Sackler Library (classical studies, art and archaeology)
 Sainsbury Library at the Saïd Business School
 Sherardian Library of Plant Taxonomy
 Taylor Institution Library (medieval, Slavonic and modern languages)
 Tylor Library (anthropology)
 Vere Harmsworth Library at the Rothermere American Institute
 Wellcome Unit for the History of Medicine Library

A further 40 college libraries and 20 faculty and speciality libraries are not members of the group.

See also
 Bodleian Library
 Bodley Medal
 Book storage
 New Bodleian Library
 University of Oxford
 Weston Library

References

2000 establishments in England
Organizations established in 2000
Bodleian Libraries
Research libraries in the United Kingdom
Bodleian Libraries